Susanna Sayadyan (born 29 October 1990) is an Armenian professional footballer. She currently plays for Armenia women's national football team.

See also
List of Armenia women's international footballers

External links
 
Profile at UEFA.com

1990 births
Living people
Armenian women's footballers
Armenia women's international footballers
Women's association football defenders